Michael Sweet may refer to:
 Michael Sweet (born 1963), American Christian rock singer and Stryper frontman
 Michael Sweet (album), his self-titled 1994 album
 Michael Ernest Sweet (born 1979), Canadian educator and photographer
 Michael Sweet (programmer), computer scientist and CUPS developer